Mind Over Maddie is an Australian family television series that airs on Disney Channel Australia. The show first aired on 25 February 2013 and stars Jessica Nash as the titular Maddie. As of March 2013, eleven 8 minute episodes have aired. The show was nominated for a 2013 Astra Award for Most Outstanding Children’s Program or Event.

Synopsis
Maddie (Jessica Nash) is an average 14-year-old girl trying to deal with her surroundings. Each day she faces different obstacles and all of her decisions are ultimately made by one of her three personality types: Optimism (Jordana Beatty), Ambition (Ellie Gall), or Doubt (Miles Gibson).

Cast
Jordana Beatty as Optimism
Ellie Gall as Ambition
Miles Gibson as Doubt
Jessica Nash as Maddie (11 episodes, 2013)

Episodes
{| class="wikitable plainrowheaders" style="text-align:center;"
! scope="col" style="padding:0 9px;" rowspan="2" colspan="2"| Season
! scope="col" style="padding:0 9px;" rowspan="2"| Episodes
! scope="col" style="padding:0 90px;" colspan="2"| Originally aired 
|-
! scope="col" | Season premiere
! scope="col" | Season finale
|-
| scope="row" style="background:#8000FF; color:#100; text-align:center;"|
| 1
| 20
| 25 February 2013
| 22 March 2013
|-
|}

Season 1 (2013)

Reception

Ratings
The series receives thousands of viewers each episode, making it one of the most watched series on Disney Channel.

Critical reception
Pam Brown of The West Australian says that it's a slick production by Julie Money and that "it's a clever way to tackle daily problems facing teens."

See also
Herman's Head, a similarly plotted American television show centering on an adult male protagonist

References

External links
 

Disney Channels Worldwide original programming
Australian children's television series
2013 Australian television series debuts
Television series about teenagers